James Brunton Simpson (22 January 1905 – 10 December 1968) was a Scottish-Australian trade unionist, coal miner and politician, elected as a member of the New South Wales Legislative Assembly for Lake Macquarie for the NSW Branch of the Labor Party.

Early life
Simpson was born at Shotts, Lanarkshire, Scotland and educated at Dykehead Public School. He started work at the age of fourteen as a coal miner. He arrived in New South Wales with his parents in 1921 and worked in Stockton Borehole Colliery at Cockle Creek until was seriously injured in a mining accident in 1924 and had to be hospitalised for seven months.

He studied commercial subjects and was employed by the Northern Districts Miners' Federation as its assistant secretary in 1927. He was secretary of the federation from 1940 to 1950. He married Grace Ellen Gallimore in May 1941 and they had one daughter and two sons.

Political career
Simpson was elected as the Labor member for Lake Macquarie in 1950 and was re-elected in the seat until his death. He was Minister without portfolio from March 1956 to November 1957 and then Secretary for Mines (renamed Minister for Mines from 1 April 1959) until May 1965 when the Renshaw government was defeated.

In 1963 the City of Lake Macquarie named the "J. B. Simpson Pool" in Speers Point in his honour.

Notes

 

1905 births
1968 deaths
Members of the New South Wales Legislative Assembly
People from Shotts
Australian Labor Party members of the Parliament of New South Wales
20th-century Australian politicians
British emigrants to Australia
Australian trade unionists
Australian coal miners
Politicians from North Lanarkshire